Cyperus longistylus is a species of sedge that is endemic to the Solomon Islands.

The species was first formally described by the botanist Georg Kükenthal in 1929.

See also
 List of Cyperus species

References

longistylus
Plants described in 1929
Taxa named by Georg Kükenthal
Flora of the Solomon Islands (archipelago)